Leonov Pavel Petrovich (Russian: Павел Петрович Леонов; 20 December 192025 March 2011) was a leading naive artist of the Soviet period.

Biography 
‘He always lived in an inverted world, through the looking glass, a world with its own laws, its own sky, its own land. He was and remains the Don Quixote of the Soviet era.’
							(Mikhail Roginsky)

Pavel Leonov had many lives: village librarian, cart-horse driver, miner, tin-smith, plasterer, factory worker, sign painter. Alongside these varied occupations he had one constant dream…to be an artist. Born in 1920 in the village of Volotovskoye in the Orel region, Leonov’s life mirrored many of the convulsions of the communist era.
Escaping from a tyrannical father who Leonov described as "a professional alcoholic", he left his village at the age of eighteen with five roubles in his pocket and a ticket for the train to Orel. His objective was nothing less than to participate in the building of a new society. In 1938 he was arrested for the first time. Many of Leonov’s large repertoire of skills were acquired as a prisoner of the Gulag system.
As a boy Leonov taught himself to draw from a manual. In the early 1960s he attended the People’s Free University in Moscow (ZNUI). There he received encouragement from the artist Mikhail Roginsky. By 1970 Leonov’s work had received serious critical attention and in the 1980s he was included in ‘The World Encyclopaedia of Naïve Art’.
However, it was at this time that he also disappeared. It was not until 1990, after almost twenty years, that he was discovered living in extreme poverty in Mekhovitzi, a village in the Ivanovo region, sharing a one-room shack with his wife and teenage son. Unable to sell his paintings he had glued them to the walls as extra insulation against the severe winters.
With the encouragement, among others, of Moscow-based art historians Olga Diakonitsina and Ksenia Bogemskaia, Leonov’s fortunes changed. Russian institutions like The Pushkin Museum, The Moscow Museum of Outsider Art and The Moscow Museum of Naïve Art embraced Leonov as a unique visionary artist. His work was lauded internationally, receiving the Grand Prix at INSITA in 1997. 
Despite his change in fortunes, his living conditions remained basic. Leonov cared little about his physical circumstances. The astonishing beauty of his work was the opposite of the life, what mattered to him was the creation and distribution of his ‘inventions’, as he called his paintings.
Still invigorated by the ideals of his youth, Leonov worked at a furious pace during the 1990s, concentrating a lifetime’s insight into a decade of phenomenal productivity. In his remote village materials were hard to come by: his canvases were sometimes sackcloth, table linen or old curtains; his paints were often cheap house paint; when his brushes wore out he would resort to sticks and bristles. Aware of but far from the social and economic anarchy of the post-Perestroika period, Leonov found the space, physically and spiritually, to construct his diagrams for a better society. As arthritis gripped his hands his work began to take on a monumental scale, echoing the Soviet murals he had seen on his travels. Figures were superimposed on carpet-like backgrounds, featuring cells of idealised activity where nature and man worked in harmony together. Friends and visitors became incorporated into his work, their faces generalised, all imbued with an inner vitality. 
"I want to show people as the best they can be," he said.

Collections 

 Vladimir-Suzdal museum
 Tsaritsino Museum, Moscow
 Moscow Museum of Naive Art
 Museum of Outsider Art, Moscow
 Horvatskaia National Gallery
 Slovak National Gallery
 Croatian National Gallery
 Museum Charlotte Zander (Germany).
 Linacre College, University of Oxford
 De Stadshof Collection, Den Haag.
 Boguemskaia-Turchin collection

Personal exhibitions

 2010 — "Павел Леонов" (Из собр. К. Богемской и А. Турчина). Галерея ROZA AZORA, Москва.
 2005 — "Павел Леонов". Московский музей современного искусства,  Москва.
 2011  _  'Pavel Leonov'. The Pushkin Museum of Fine Art, Moscow.

Exhibitions 

 Insita 97, Bratislava, Slovakia.
 Golden dream "Сон Золотой", 1993, Moscow
 Gallery "Дар" in 1990th,
 Kovcheg Gallery галерея Ковчег (1999), Moscow
 Lost Paradise "Потерянный рай" (Проун галерея, 2005),
 Art fair Art-Moscow ярмарка Арт-Москва (2008),
 Art fair Art-Manege ярмарка Арт-Манеж (многократно).
 Festnaive -07 Участник Московских международных фестивалей наивного искусства и творчества аутсайдеров "Фестнаив — 2004
 Henry Boxer Gallery, London 2007
 St Etienne Gallery New York, 2001, 2003
 Ziv gallery, Edinburgh, Scotland  1997
 Oxford University, Ruskin School of Fine Art and Drawing 2001
 Hamer Gallery, Amsterdam, 1999
 Museum Charlotte Zander (Germany), 1999
 Roza Azora Gallery Moscow, 2010
 Garage Center for Contemporary Culture, Moscow. August, September 2012
 La Halle Saint Pierre Paris RAW VISION 25 ans d’Art Brut du 18/09/2013 au 22/08/2014

Publication: Огонёк, Коммерсант, Raw vision.

References

Bibliography
 Official Pavel Leonov website, http://www.pavelleonov.com
 James Young. A Fool's Paradise. Raw Vision, 28, http://www.rawvision.com/articles/28/leonov/leonov.html
 Энциклопедия Наивного искусства, Белград, 1984
 К. Г. Богемская. Наивное искусство. Павел Леонов. СПб.: Дмитрий Буланин, 2005. https://web.archive.org/web/20101220004411/http://www.chtivo.ru/chtivo%3D3%26bkid%3D715900.htm
 Телепередаче о выставке к 80-летию https://www.youtube.com/watch?v=z5fFZiTDbq0
 Художник от природы, "Коммерсант", 2005 http://www.kommersant.ru/doc.aspx?DocsID=625805
 Наивное искусство П. П. Леонова в Московском музее современного искусства http://www.museum.ru/n24312
 Павел Леонов. Я другой такой страны не знаю: Каталог / Галерея "Дар" — М., 1999
 Дьяконицына О. Д. "Я, художник Павел Леонов, всю жизнь страны и природу наношу на полотно" // Народное творчество. 1997. № 1
 Павел Леонов. Живопись. — Государственное учреждение культуры города Москвы "Музей наивного искусства", Москва, 2005 https://web.archive.org/web/20111008081002/http://www.naive-art-museum.narod.ru/editions.htm
 Страничка про Леонова на сайте Музея Наивного искусства: https://web.archive.org/web/20110603094400/http://www.naive-art-museum.narod.ru/Artists-pages/Leonov-PP_Artist.htm
 The Croatian Museum of Naive Art — Guide to the Permanent Display https://web.archive.org/web/20130927064623/http://www.hmnu.org/en/vodic.asp
 Film "Leonov From Mehovitsi" "Леонов из Меховиц". Режиссер А. Мурашов
 https://www.youtube.com/watch?v=GavzOj8E0Ss
 World Encyclopedia Of Naive Art.  Bihalji-Merin, Oto 1985 (Harper & Row )
 'Pavel Leonov - Paintings' Moscow State Museum of Naive Art. 2005

Modern painters
Naïve painters
1920 births
2011 deaths
Soviet painters
People from Oryol Oblast
20th-century Russian painters
21st-century Russian painters